IHPA may refer to the:
 Independent Health Professionals Association
 Illinois Historic Preservation Agency
 International HCH and Pesticides Association
 Iowa Historic Preservation Alliance